Aerovip was an airline based in Buenos Aires, Argentina (not to be confused with Aero VIP of Uruguay). It operates regional passenger services. Its main base is Ezeiza International Airport, Buenos Aires.

Operations were suspended in November 2004, with the airline in debt, but restarted operations in 2009. However, the airline ceased operations again in November 2010.

History
The airline was established on 15 March 1999 and started operations on 23 June 1999. It operated for a time as LAPA VIP and as ARG Express until sold back to its original owner. The airline was owned by Sebastian Agote.  Operations were suspended in November 2004.

Teba, which held the concession for the Buenos Aires bus station, acquired a controlling stake in Aerovip in December 2004, buying shares representing 80% of the outstanding equity that belonged to Sebastian Agote. The other 20% will remain in hands of Eduardo Eurnekian, head of airport concessionaire Aeropuertos Argentina 2000. Aerovip has not been flying since October 3, 2004 and has debts of over US$9 million. In a meeting with the Aeronautic Union (APA),
the new owners committed to resume flights by December 20, 2004 and maintain the current payroll.

In 2005 it was announced that LAN Airlines would absorb LAFSA and Aero VIP into LAN Argentina. Pilots, stewards and maintenance personnel of LAN Argentina went on strike in November 2005 to protest at management’s failure to hire 150 former workers of Aero VIP.

In 2009 the Leadgate group, owner 75% of the shares of the Uruguayan airline Pluna, buys Aerovip. The Argentine airline will restart operations in 2010 a former Pluna Bombardier CRJ-900. In November of the same year, Aerovip was absorbed by PLUNA.

Destinations

Aerovip operated the following services (at January 2005):

Domestic scheduled destinations: Buenos Aires, Mar del Plata and Villa Gesell.
International scheduled destinations: Montevideo and Punta del Este.

Fleet

The Aerovip fleet included the following aircraft (as of 18 February 2010) :

1 Bombardier CRJ-900ER
The aircraft was delivered in 2009, but deposed in 2010

Previously operated

1 Fairchild Metro III
6 BAe Jetstream 32EP

See also 

 List of defunct airlines of South America

References

Notes

External links

  Official website 
  Article about end of operations, "Cronista Comercial" newspaper, 2010-11-16 (retrieved 2014-05-09)

Defunct airlines of Argentina
Airlines established in 1999
Airlines disestablished in 2010
2010 disestablishments in Argentina
Argentine companies established in 1999